Werner Arnold (born 11 June 1931) is a German retired weightlifter. He competed at the 1960 Summer Olympics in the heavyweight category and finished in 12th place. He won six East German championships in 1957–1961 and 1965.

References

External links
 

1931 births
Possibly living people
German male weightlifters
Olympic weightlifters of the United Team of Germany
Weightlifters at the 1960 Summer Olympics